Charles Edward Vreeland (March 10, 1852September 27, 1916) was an officer of the United States Navy who reached the rank of rear admiral.

Early life
Born in Newark, New Jersey, Vreeland enlisted in the Navy as a naval apprentice early in 1866. After a brief service in the  he was given a presidential appointment soon afterwards to enter the U.S. Naval Academy on July 27, 1866, graduating from that institution on June 7, 1870, as a passed midshipman. He received his commission as an ensign in November 1873 after a series of cruises onboard screw sloops.

Naval career
Vreeland was further promoted to master and then lieutenant after successive tours of duty on board the screw steamer , the gunboat  and the sloop-of-war . He was then assigned to the Nautical Almanac Office of the US Naval Observatory in November 1881 after a brief period ashore awaiting orders. In March 1884, Lt. Vreeland began a three-year tour at sea aboard the sloop-of-war , after which he was assigned for two years at the Bureau of Navigation. He was then assigned briefly (from July to September 1889) with the Office of Naval Intelligence and reported to the Coast Survey late in October, a posting he took until the spring of 1893, when Vreeland was assigned a series of tours as naval attaché — first in Rome, Vienna and finally in Berlin.

After returning home in late 1896, Lt. Vreeland was posted to the battleship  in mid-January 1897, and served aboard her until he was transferred to the gunboat  at the end of June, whereupon he served through most of the Spanish–American War on blockade duty off the port of Manzanillo until the end of July 1898, even though he was named executive officer of the cruiser  in April of that year. He did not actually assume those duties until August 24. Vreeland was promoted to lieutenant commander, and served aboard various vessels in the Asiatic Squadron. He returned home on board the hospital ship  in March 1900. From April 1900 to before August 1902 he was a member of the Board of Inspection and Survey, during which time he was promoted to full commander in mid-August 1901. After his duty in the Board, he supervised the fitting out of the new monitor  (later renamed the Ozark) and assumed command upon her commissioning on October 28 of that year.

Two years later, Vreeland relinquished command of the Ozark and served on shore a series of special assignments for the Department of the Navy for the next few years, during which he received his promotion to captain on April 13, 1906. After finishing his on-shore assignments in Washington, D.C. on April 17, 1907, Capt. Vreeland went to New York Ship in Camden, New Jersey the next day to commission the new  . He commanded the battleship for the next two years, which was an auspicious time, for the Kansas was picked to be part of the "Great White Fleet" that sailed around the world. Soon after the Fleet returned to Hampton Roads on February 22, 1909, he gave up his command of the Kansas and returned home to await orders. On May 10, he succeeded Captain Raymond P. Rodgers as Chief Intelligence Officer, the head of the Office of Naval Intelligence until December 8, when he was succeeded by Captain Templin M. Potts.

On December 27, he became Rear Admiral Charles Vreeland.

On April 19, 1911, he reported ashore for further duty in Washington. In the newly devised aide system for managing the Navy, Vreeland became one of the four principal advisors of the Secretary of the Navy, George von Lengerke Meyer. As Aide for Inspections, he reached the pinnacle of naval command.

On December 12, Rear Admiral Vreeland ended his tour of duty as Aide for Inspections and succeeded Rear Admiral Richard Wainwright as the second Aide for Operations. While in that position, Vreeland struggled to improve the defenses in the Philippine Islands, agitated for increased naval construction, particularly of battlecruisers, and supported the development of U.S. naval aviation. It was also during his tenure that naval aviation found a permanent home in Pensacola, Florida. On February 11, 1903, he was succeeded by Bradley A. Fiske as Aide for Operations, and Vreeland finished out his naval career as member of both the General and Joint Boards. He retired on March 10, 1914.

Rear Admiral Charles E. Vreeland died in Atlantic City, New Jersey after a brief retirement marked by illness.

Namesake
The   was named after him.

References

External links
 Vreeland's U.S.S. Arkansas Scrapbook, 1902-1903, MS 187 held by Special Collections & Archives, Nimitz Library at the United States Naval Academy

1852 births
1916 deaths
Military personnel from Newark, New Jersey
United States Naval Academy alumni
United States Navy admirals
Directors of the Office of Naval Intelligence
Burials at Arlington National Cemetery
Vreeland family